Tousled Peak is a small ice-covered peak, 1,220 m, situated 3.5 nautical miles (6 km) northwest of the summit of Mount Lubbock in the south end of Daniell Peninsula, Victoria Land. The name given by New Zealand Antarctic Place-Names Committee (NZ-APC) in 1966 is descriptive of the exceptionally broken ice summit.

Mountains of Victoria Land
Borchgrevink Coast